Gitwinksihlkw formerly Canyon City, is a Nisga'a Village in the Nass River valley of northwestern British Columbia, Canada, near that river's confluence with the Tseax River.  An older spelling is Kitwilluchsilt.   It is one of four Nisga'a villages.  Road access is via the Nisga'a Highway.

Education
The community is served by School District 92 Nisga'a and hosts Gitwinksihlkw Elementary School.  The secondary school is in Gitlax̱t'aamiks.

See also
Nisga'a Memorial Lava Beds Provincial Park

References

External links
Nisga'a Lisims - village website
School website
Nisga'a Nation Knowledge Network
BCGNIs entry "Gitwinksihlkw"
BCGNIS entry "Canyon City"

Designated places in British Columbia
Nisga'a villages
Nass Country